The Moto E4 and Moto E4 Plus are Android smartphones developed by Motorola Mobility, a subsidiary of Lenovo. They were released in June 2017. The phones are regarded as being low-budget and having a long battery life. The E4 model has a 2,800 mAh battery and the E4 Plus has a 5,000 mAh battery.  The Moto E4 has an 8 megapixel camera, while the Plus version has a 13 megapixel one. Both Moto E4 variants also have custom ROMs available.

Generation comparison 

All generations use: 
 micro-SIMs
 micro-USB B power connectors
 Bluetooth version is 4.2 LE.

A fingerprint sensor is included on the unlocked E4 and the E4 for Verizon and for U.S. Cellular. A fingerprint sensor is not included with the Sprint E4.

See also
 Moto C

References

Android (operating system) devices
Motorola smartphones